Natalie Sago (born May 24, 1989) is a professional basketball referee in the National Basketball Association (NBA), wearing number 9. Sago is the fifth woman to become a full-time NBA referee.

On November 15, 2018, the NBA announced that Sago was promoted to become a full-time member of the league's officiating staff; she previously officiated NBA games as a non-staff referee. She previously officiated three full seasons in both the NBA Gatorade League and the WNBA. 

Sago played college softball for Jefferson College from 2007–2009 and Drury University for 2009-2011. Sago earned a bachelor's degree in K-12 Physical Education from the University of Missouri–St. Louis. 

Sago's father, Dr. Shelton Sago, officiated basketball for 35 years for the Missouri State High School Athletic Association, retiring in 2019. He continues to officiate HS football.

References

External links
 National Basketball Referees Association bio

1989 births
Living people
College women's basketball players in the United States
National Basketball Association referees
American women referees and umpires
Women basketball referees
NBA G League referees